The 1977 Cairo Open was a men's tennis tournament played on outdoor clay courts. It was an independent tournament i.e. not part of the 1977 Colgate-Palmolive Grand Prix circuit. It was the second edition of the tournament and was played in Cairo, Egypt from 21 March until 27 March 1977. First-seeded François Jauffret won the singles title.

Finals

Singles
 François Jauffret defeated  Frank Gebert 6–3, 7–5, 6–4

Doubles
 John Bartlett /  John Marks defeated  Pat DuPré /  Chris Lewis 7–5, 6–1, 6–3

References

Cairo Open
Cairo Open
1977 in Egyptian sport